The second cabinet of Matti Vanhanen was the 70th cabinet and Government of Finland. The cabinet held office from 19 April 2007 to 20 June 2010. The cabinet was a centre-right-led coalition, consisting of four parties: the Centre Party, the National Coalition Party, the Green League and the Swedish People's Party.

During Vanhanen's second cabinet, for the first time in history, there were more women (12) than men (8) in a Finnish government.

|}

References

Vanhanen, 2
2007 establishments in Finland
2010 disestablishments in Finland
Cabinets established in 2007
Cabinets disestablished in 2010